Giorgi Magaldadze (born 2 February 1994) is a Georgian professional footballer who plays for Guria Lanchkhuti.

References

External links
 
 Profile at Pressball

1994 births
Living people
Association football forwards
Footballers from Georgia (country)
Expatriate footballers from Georgia (country)
Expatriate footballers in Belarus
Expatriate footballers in Ukraine
Expatriate footballers in Moldova
FC Stal-2 Alchevsk players
FC Belshina Bobruisk players
FC Saxan players
FC Spartaki Tskhinvali players
FC Samtredia players
FC Guria Lanchkhuti players
FC Borjomi players